This list of Chinese architects includes notable architects and architecture firms with a strong connection to China (i.e., born in China, located in China or known primarily for their work in China). For a more complete list, see :Category:Chinese architects and :Category:Architecture firms of China.

Individuals

A

B

C

D

E

F

G

H

I

J

K

L

M

N

O

P

 Pau Shiu-hung
 I.M. Pei
 Thomas Luff Perkins

Q
 Qi Kang

R
 Rong Baisheng

S

T

U

V

W

X

Y

Z

Firms

See also

 Chinese architecture
 List of architects
 List of Chinese artists

References

Chinese architects
Architects